Youjiang Zhuang, named after the Youjiang River in Guangxi, China,  is a Northern Tai or Zhuang Language spoken in Tiandong County, Tianyang District, and parts of the Youjiang District in Baise, Guangxi.

History and classification

André-Georges Haudricourt in 1956 included the language of Tianzhou, the county seat of Tianyang, under Dioi, his name for Northern Zhuang.

Based on data from the 1950s Guangxi Zhuang language survey, Tiandong, Tianyang and a suburb of Baise City were grouped together. This grouping was sometimes called Tianyangese. In the 1999 A Study of Zhuang Dialects this group was referred to as the Youjiang language, and in 2007 Youjiang Zhuang was added as a separate language to Ethnologue.

Phonology

Writing System
Youjiang Zhuang has two main writing systems, characters and romanization.

References

Tai languages